Nicolas Deslauriers (born February 22, 1991) is a Canadian professional ice hockey left winger currently playing for the Philadelphia Flyers of the National Hockey League (NHL). He was drafted in the third round, 84th overall, by the Los Angeles Kings at the 2009 NHL Entry Draft. His play has been described as a mix between an enforcer and a grinder.

Deslauriers was born in LaSalle, Quebec, but grew up in Saint-Anicet, Quebec.

Early life
Deslauriers was born on February 22, 1991, in LaSalle, Quebec, to parents Penny and Stephane. His parents co-own a moving company in Quebec. Growing up, Deslauriers played both baseball and hockey but, after qualifying for the midget Triple-A team Châteauguay Patriotes, he dropped baseball and focused solely on hockey. As a child, his favourite player was Boston Bruins defenceman Bobby Orr because he was a defenceman.

Playing career

Amateur
Deslauriers played major junior hockey in the Quebec Major Junior Hockey League (QMJHL) with the Rouyn-Noranda Huskies and the Gatineau Olympiques. At the 2009 NHL Entry Draft, he was drafted in the third round, 84th overall, by the Los Angeles Kings. Following the draft, Deslauriers was tied for 12th amongst league defensemen with 45 points through 65 regular-season games. He was traded to the Gatineau Olympiques prior to the 2010–11 QMJHL season in exchange for a second and third round draft pick. During the 2011 QMJHL playoffs, Deslauriers led all QMJHL defensemen in post-season scoring with 20 points.

Professional

Los Angeles Kings

On May 31, 2011, Los Angeles signed Deslauriers to a three-year, entry-level contract. Deslauriers was subsequently reassigned to their American Hockey League (AHL) with the Manchester Monarchs. He made his professional debut with the team during the 2011–12 season and finished with 14 points through 65 games. Deslauriers began the following season with the Monarchs before being recalled to the NHL level on May 9, 2013. He played a few games with the Manchester Monarchs as a forward but was expected to return to his natural defensive position the following season. However, during the 2013 offseason, Jack Ferreira, special assistant to Kings GM, suggested that Deslauriers become a full time left wing. As such, he was asked to play the new position during training camp and recorded four goals during the pre-season.

Buffalo Sabres
On March 5, 2014, Deslauriers was traded to the Buffalo Sabres, along with Hudson Fasching, in exchange for defenceman Brayden McNabb, Jonathan Parker and two draft picks. He had been originally sent down to the Rochester Americans but injuries to the Sabres lineup earned him a quick recall. He subsequently made his NHL debut a few days later on March 7, 2014, in a 2–0 loss to the Florida Panthers. In his second career NHL game, Deslauriers played 12:13 minutes of ice time and threw three hits. His play was praised by interim coach Ted Nolan who said: "You look at Deslauriers, for a young kid too, his second game in the National Hockey League, he competed out there. You can never go wrong when you have guys that love to compete." He scored his first career NHL goal on April 4 with 6:40 remaining in the third period in a 3–2 loss to the Detroit Red Wings. Deslauriers finished the season by scoring one goal through 17 of the Sabres' last 20 games. As such, he was re-signed to a two-year contract with the team on May 26, 2014.

Deslauriers remained in Buffalo during the 2014 offseason where he lost nearly 20 pounds. During the pre-season, he skated alongside Sam Reinhart and was worked into a checking role with Cody McCormick and Patrick Kaleta. Having formally played as a defenseman, the 2014–15 season became Deslauriers' first as a winger. When speaking on the change, he said he felt better playing on the wing but would change positions if needed. He finished the season playing in all 82 games and tallying 15 points and 71 penalty minutes. He also finished ninth in the league with 261 hits. As a result of his play, Deslauriers was voted the teams' Rookie of the Year.

On January 4, 2016, head coach Dan Bylsma announced that Deslauriers would miss three to six weeks while recovering from a lower body injury. At the time of the injury, Deslauriers had tallied three goals and seven points through 38 games. After spending nearly a month recovering, Deslauriers returned to the Sabres lineup on February 3. Upon returning, Deslauriers was placed on team's third line alongside Cal O'Reilly and Zemgus Girgensons. Although he finished the season healthy, Deslauriers sustained a knee injury on October 30 that caused him to miss 19 games. He was limited to only 42 games during the 2016–17 season and averaged a career-low 7:25 time on ice while recording no goals and two assists. During the offseason, he returned to his home province Quebec.

After three full seasons in Buffalo, Deslauriers was assigned to their AHL affiliate, the Rochester Americans, before the 2017–18 season.

Montreal Canadiens
On October 4, 2017, the opening day of the NHL season, Deslauriers was traded by the Sabres to the Montreal Canadiens in exchange for Zach Redmond. Upon joining the team, he was reassigned to the Laval Rocket where he tallied three goals and five points in 14 games. On November 15, 2017, he was recalled to the NHL level and made his debut with the Canadiens in a game against the Arizona Coyotes. He remained with the team through December where he led the team with four goals through 11 games. He also led all NHL players with 54 hits, and ranked first on the team and tied for seventh in the league in goal differentials. In honour of his improved playing skills in December, Deslauriers earned the Molson Cup honour at the end of December 2017. Following this, he was promoted to play on the Canadiens' top line with Jonathan Drouin and Alex Galchenyuk. After playing in 36 games with the Canadiens, Deslauriers signed a two-year, one-way contract extension worth $1.9 million.

Upon finishing the previous season with numerous career-highs, Deslauriers rejoined the Canadiens for their 2018–19 campaign. During a preseason matchup against the New Jersey Devils on September 17, 2018, Deslauriers suffered a facial fracture and was placed on the injured reserve. He returned to the lineup for Montreal's game against the Ottawa Senators on October 20, 2018. On November 8, 2018, Deslauriers scored his first points of the 2018–19 season. Against his former team, the Buffalo Sabres, he assisted a goal by Matthew Peca and scored a shorthanded goal of his own. Deslauriers was unable to replicate his previous season offensive totals, contributing with just two goals and five points through 48 games.

Anaheim Ducks
On June 30, 2019, Deslauriers was traded by the Canadiens to the Anaheim Ducks in exchange for a 2020 fourth-round draft pick. Upon joining the team for the 2019–20 season, Deslauriers tallied seven points and 80 penalty minutes through 45 games by February. As such, he signed a two-year contract to remain with the Anaheim Ducks organization. Following the contract signing, Deslauriers set the record for fastest hat trick in Ducks history after scoring all three goals in the first period. His third goal came at 11:49 in the first period of a 5–2 win over the Ottawa Senators.

Minnesota Wild
On March 19, 2022, just days before the trade deadline, Deslauriers was traded to the Minnesota Wild for a third round pick in 2023.

Philadelphia Flyers
As a free agent from the Wild, Deslauriers was signed to a four-year, $7 million contract with the Philadelphia Flyers on July 13, 2022.

Personal life
Deslauriers and his wife Joanie have four children together. He has a tattoo on the left arm of the saying "The future will be whatever you make it." Off the ice, Deslauriers owns the XPN Centre in Saint-Bruno, Quebec.

Career statistics

References

External links

1991 births
Living people
Anaheim Ducks players
Buffalo Sabres players
Canadian ice hockey left wingers
Gatineau Olympiques players
Laval Rocket players
Los Angeles Kings draft picks
Manchester Monarchs (AHL) players
Minnesota Wild players
Montreal Canadiens players
People from LaSalle, Quebec
People from Montérégie
Philadelphia Flyers players
Rochester Americans players
Rouyn-Noranda Huskies players
Ice hockey people from Montreal